Church Slavonic was the main language used for administrative (until the 16th century) and liturgical purposes (until the 17th century) by the Romanian principalities, being still occasionally used in the Orthodox Church until the early 18th century.

Characteristics 

The language, while based on Church Slavonic, was influenced by the Slavic languages used by surrounding peoples. The most important influences were from Middle and Modern Bulgarian, with some smaller influences from Serbian (in Wallachia) and Russian (in Moldavia). Starting with the 15th century, the language was also influenced by Romanian language.

Usage 

After the Slavic migrations, Slavonic became the liturgical language of the Eastern Orthodox Church in present-day Romania, under the influence of the South Slavic feudal states. The exact timing of this change happened is not known, but it was probably in the 10th century. While the language was not understood by most Romanians, it was a language known by the bishops, the monks, some of the priests, the clerks, the merchants, the boyars and the Prince.

Church Slavonic was also used as a literary language, for example in chronicles, story-books, law codexes (known as pravila), property documents (hrisov), decrees of the voivodes or boyars, diplomatic correspondence and sometimes even in private letters. It also led to an integration of the written Romanian culture into the Slavic culture of the neighbours.

Replacement with Romanian 

The earliest contracts (zapis) to be written in Romanian rather than Slavonic date from 1575 to 1590 and by 1655–1660, all the administrative documents at the Princely Courts of both Wallachia and Moldavia were written in Romanian.

The replacement of Slavonic religious texts with Romanian versions began with the first translations in Máramaros (now Maramureș) in the late 15th century, further translations being created in Transylvania after the Protestant Reformation. In Wallachia, the gospels were translated into the vernacular between 1512 and 1518, and by the middle of the 16th century, the earliest religious works were printed, while the first complete bible in Romanian was printed in Bucharest in 1688.

Nevertheless, the Orthodox Church opposed the changes and the Metropolitan printing presses continued to print Church Slavonic books until 1731 in Moldavia and 1745 in Wallachia.

Legacy and assessments
Coresi, the printer of the first Romanian-language book, saw in 1564 no good in the usage of Church Slavonic as a liturgical language, as the priests speak to the people in a foreign language, arguing that all the other peoples have the word of God in their language, except for the Romanians. Dimitrie Cantemir, a Moldavian scholar who published the first novel in Romanian, saw the usage of Church Slavonic as a "barbarism", which caused a cultural regression.

However, there were some cultural accomplishments done in the Church Slavonic language, such as a number of chronicles and historiographical works in Moldavia or Neagoe Basarab's Teachings to his son Theodosie.

See also
 Slavic influence on Romanian

Notes

References

V. Costăchel, P. P. Panaitescu, A. Cazacu. (1957) Viaţa feudală în Ţara Românească şi Moldova (secolele XIV–XVI) ("Feudal life in the Romanian and Moldovan Land (14th–16th centuries)", București, Editura Ştiinţifică
Vlad Georgescu. (1991) The Romanians: a history, Ohio State University Press. 

History of Christianity in Romania
Languages of Romania
Romania
Romanian Orthodox Church
Sacred languages